Reyes del Show is the season three of the 2013 edition of El Gran Show premiered on November 9, 2013.

This season the 11 golden palette returned. In addition, there was a change in the mechanics of elimination: two couples were sentenced and during the same gala the duel was held, the public had 10 minutes to vote, the less voted party was eliminated. There was also a change in the danceathon, being of immediate elimination, until there is only one winning couple.

On December 21, 2013, actress Carolina Cano and Eduardo Pastrana were crowned champions, model & reality TV star Gino Pesaressi and Jacqueline Alfaro finished second, while actress & model Emilia Drago and Sergio Lois finished third.

Cast

Couples 
The participating couples of this season were made up of the first three places of the first and second season, being the season with the fewest couples so far. Arturo Chumbe and César "Chechi" Yáñez returned as coaches.

Previous seasons

Host and judges 
Gisela Valcárcel, Aldo Díaz, Paco Bazán and Gachi Rivero returned as hosts, while Morella Petrozzi, Carlos Cacho, Phillip Butters, Pachi Valle Riestra and the VIP Jury returned as judges.

Scoring charts 

Green numbers indicate the best steps for each week
 the couple was sentenced and eliminated that week
 the couple was sentenced and saved that week
 the couple was sentenced and eliminated that week, but saved with a lifeguard
 the winning couple
 the runner-up couple
 the third-place couple

Average score chart 
This table only counts dances scored on a 40-point scale.

Highest and lowest scoring performances 
The best and worst performances in each dance according to the judges' 40-point scale are as follows:

Couples' highest and lowest scoring dances 
Scores are based upon a potential 40-point maximum.

Weekly scores 
Individual judges' scores in the charts below (given in parentheses) are listed in this order from left to right: Morella Petrozzi, Carlos Cacho, Phillip Butters, Pachi Valle Riestra, VIP Jury.

Week 1: First Dances 
The couples danced hip-hop, merengue or salsa, a team dance and the danceathon. In the duel, the elimination was canceled because the production only used it as a demonstration method.
Running order

Week 2: The Pop Stars 
The couples danced pop and the danceathon. In the versus, the couples faced dancing different dance styles.

Due to an injury, Lindathay Valero was unable to perform, so Víctor Hugo Dávila danced with troupe member Julliana Villacorta instead.
Running order

Week 3: Salsa & Freestyle Night 
The couples danced salsa, a freestyle performed in a rotating room and the danceathon.
Running order

Week 4: Reggaeton & Cumbia Night 
The couples danced reggaeton and cumbia.
Running order

Week 5: Quarterfinals 
The couples danced pachanga and trio strip dance involving another celebrity. In the little train, the participants faced dancing jazz.
Running order

Week 6: Semifinals 
The couples danced salsa and trio tex-mex involving another celebrity. In the versus, the couples faced dancing different dance styles.
Running order

Week 7: Finals 
On the first part, the couples danced cumbia and a mix trio dance (mambo/merengue/quebradita) involving another celebrity.

On the second part, the final three couples performed one unlearned dance.
Running order (Part 1)

Running order (Part 2)

Dance chart 
The celebrities and professional partners will dance one of these routines for each corresponding week:
 Week 1: Hip-hop, merengue or salsa, team dances & the danceathon (First Dances)
 Week 2: Pop, the danceathon & the versus (The Pop Stars)
 Week 3: Salsa, freestyle & the danceathon (Salsa & Freestyle Night)
 Week 4: Reggaeton & cumbia (Reggaeton & Cumbia Night)
 Week 5: Pachanga, strip dance & the little train (Quarterfinals)
 Week 6: Salsa, tex-mex & the versus (Semifinals)
 Week 7: Cumbia, mix (mambo/merengue/quebradita) & one unlearned dance (Finals)

 Highest scoring dance
 Lowest scoring dance
 Gained bonus points for winning this dance
 Gained no bonus points for losing this dance

Notes

References

External links 

El Gran Show
2013 Peruvian television seasons
Reality television articles with incorrect naming style